Julie Macklowe (born Julie Lerner December 1977) is an American beauty entrepreneur and businesswoman. Formerly in finance, she is the founder and spokesperson of vbeauté, a luxury skincare line offering Swiss botanical skincare products for women. She is also an investor, former hedge fund manager, philanthropist, and socialite. In 2021, she released The Macklowe, a luxury American single malt whisky.

Background 
Macklowe was born in Aspen and raised in Arizona, the daughter of Frank Lerner. She took over her grandfather's T-shirt company and turned it into a women's sportswear company. She completed her B.A. in Economics and B.S. in Commerce, graduating magna cum laude at the University of Virginia McIntire School of Commerce in 1999. It was there that she received an early induction into New York finance circles while taking John Griffin’s class.

Career

2000-2008: Early Career 
In 2000, Macklowe worked with Chase Capital Management (now JPMorgan Partners) in Seoul and Hong Kong where she helped structure leverage buyouts. Between 2003 and 2006, Macklowe was the Managing Director of Metropolitan Capital Management, and in 2006, she joined the investment firm SAC, where she managed investment portfolios for Sigma Capital Management.

2009-2010: Macklowe Asset Management 
In 2009, backed by Millenium Partners, Macklowe opened her own $250 million hedge fund, Macklowe Asset Management. In October 2010, Macklowe closed the fund to pursue her own investments in fashion businesses.

 In an interview the following year, she said, "I haven’t looked at a stock since the day I left.”

2010-2020: Fashion Industry Investments 

After leaving a career in hedge funds and finance, Macklowe turned to the fashion industry leveraging her prior business experience with her family's clothing business.

BaubleBar
In December 2010, Macklowe's first fashion industry investment, BaubleBar, launched with help from Accel Partners. The online startup, sells jewelry direct from suppliers and designers which normally work with retailers.  Macklowe helped the company in its initial fundraising efforts and currently sits on the company's board.

Macklowe was the muse for Zang Toi, for his Spring 2013 collection and debuted on the runway show September 9, 2012.

vbeauté 
Macklowe launched her own skincare company, vbeauté on November 1, 2011. Vbeauté started as a luxury, travel-friendly toiletry kit that meets TSA regulations for carry on luggage and was developed by CRB Cosmetics, a research lab in Switzerland. The inspiration for the company came in 2009, when she was flying to a friend's wedding in France, when her toiletries were confiscated by security. In 2011, the company raised $4 million and was sold at 37 stores. In September 2014, vbeauté launched a deal with the Home Shopping Network (HSN) to be sold exclusively at HSN and select boutiques. After its first year on HSN, vbeauté became one of the fastest growing beauty brands on television.  Vbeauté currently sells a wide range of luxury skin care products, known for containing the Alpine Rose as a main ingredient.

2021-current: The Macklowe 

In December 2021, Macklowe launched The Macklowe, the first luxury American single malt whiskey label. The Macklowe is distilled in limited quantities and according to The New York Times, retails for $1,500. It is available in select New York bars and restaurants. Macklowe told The Wall Street Journal that decades of curating her own massive collection of high end whiskey inspired her to create her own brand.

Macklowe teamed up with Scottish distiller and blender Ian MacMillan, known for his work with Bunnahabhain and Bladnoch. The brand follows a farm-to-table philosophy, which includes a locally sourced malted barley. The product is made, matured, and bottled in Kentucky using traditional bourbon production techniques, using a column still and copper doubler.   The product is bottled in hand-crafted, hand painted bottles that are designed after flasks.

Jean-Georges’ restaurants, Eleven Madison Park and Daniel, the Polo Bar, and institutions like Marea, Catch Steak, Carbone, Le Pavillon, Le Bilboquet, Casa Cipriani, Casa Lever, Lola Taverna, Bemelmans at the Carlyle, the Grill, the Lobster Club and Tutto il Giorno serve it.

Personal life 
In 2004, Julie married Billy Macklowe, founder of William Macklowe Company. The couple live in Manhattan and Long Island with their daughters. In addition to their residence in New York City, the couple owns houses in both Aspen and the Hamptons.

In 2008, Macklowe was named Vogue magazine's "It Girl".

In 2011, Macklowe hosted her 34th birthday party, which also featured the launch of her new vBeauté skin care line. The event was part of a cooperative effort to raise money for VH1's Save the Music Foundation.

In December of 2022, Macklowe's 45th birthday party made headlines for its high-profile 600 person guest list and risqué dress code of "leather and lingerie". Celebrities such as Romona Singer, Kelly Bensimon, Ronan Farrow, Julia Haart, and Stacey Bendet attended, among others, with music by Bob Moses. A seven foot ice sculpture of The Macklowe bottle served as a focal point of the evening. The party, its guests, and fashion were featured in New York Magazine. 

Macklowe has been photographed at various social and philanthropic events wearing a range of designers including Dolce & Gabbana, Calvin Klein, Balenciaga and Oscar de la Renta.  She has attended events such as the Couture Council and New Yorkers for Children fall gala. Macklowe also collects ball gowns, some of which have been showcased in the Alexander McQueen: Savage Beauty art exhibition at The Metropolitan Museum of Art. Macklowe is a lifelong whiskey aficionado and is a prominent whiskey ambassador.

Philanthropy and other activities
Early in her career, Macklowe created the “Learn to Invest” class for the all-girls Cathedral High School in New York.

Macklowe previously sat on the board of VH1’s Save the Music Foundation, whose mission is to restore music education in the United States. Macklowe and her husband co-chaired the 2015 concert dinner at their summer estate in the Hamptons for the VH1 Save The Music Foundation, where musicians such as Jason Derulo headlined. The concert raised nearly $800,000.

Macklowe is also actively involved with the Seven Bar Foundation, a non-profit which provides microfinance for impoverished women. She also serves on the friends committees for New Yorkers for Children, a non-profit which focuses on the academic success of foster children, and the Costume Institute at the Metropolitan Museum of Art, to whom she has contributed four of the exhibit's gowns.

After Hurricane Sandy hit New York, Macklowe and her family offered to take refugees into their Upper East Side home.

Macklowe currently sits on the Advisory Board of the University of Virginia McIntire School of Commerce. She is also a founding advisory board member for Fashion Week at Lincoln Center, the current Chairwoman of the Fashion Institute of Technology's Couture Council, and co-chaired the 2015 Couture Council Luncheon.

References 

Living people
People from Aspen, Colorado
McIntire School of Commerce alumni
American investors
American women investors
American women company founders
American company founders
21st-century American businesswomen
21st-century American businesspeople
1977 births